Vera Michalski-Hoffmann (born 5 November 1954) is a Swiss billionaire businesswoman, significant shareholder in Roche Holding and publisher. She is the president of several publishing houses in Switzerland, France and Poland, grouped together in a holding company, Libella SA, based in Lausanne. She founded the Jan Michalski Foundation in Montricher.

Biography
Until the age of 20, Vera Hoffmann (of Swiss and Austrian origin) lived in Camargue, at the Tour du Valat research facility,  from Arles. At that time, the centre's activities included clearly a communist vision of common life, an agricultural dimension and its electricity was supplied by a generator. Her father, Luc Hoffmann (1923–2016), founded the centre. Equipped with a PhD in zoology, he dedicated much of his time, thoughts and funds to preserving and protecting nature. In 1961, he and Peter Scott, son of the famous South Pole explorer, founded the World Wildlife Fund (WWF). Now supported by the family's MAVA Foundation, this research centre has become an important international hub for the conservation and study of Mediterranean wetlands. The Foundation, which owns nearly 2,500 hectares of wetlands in the Camargue region, is responsible for protecting the area.

During her childhood, Vera Hoffmann attended a private school created by her parents and accredited by the French authorities. Approximately 14 children, including Vera's two sisters and one brother, were schooled there. Most of them were children of people who worked at the ornithological facility, along with a few  poor neighbours.

Vera's mother, Daria Razumovsky, was the descendant of Austrian and Russian immigrants who fled their homeland during the Russian Revolution. The story of her grandmother's childhood (from 1914 to 1919) was published and translated in 1990. In 2004, the diary kept by Vera's mother and two aunts was also published.

Vera studied at the Graduate Institute of International and Development Studies (IHEID) in Geneva where she began working on her thesis entitled “Le phénomène des compagnons de route du communisme en France, de 1928 à 1939” (The phenomenon of Communism's road companions in France from 1928 to 1939”). However, she decided to interrupt her doctorate studies to focus on publishing.

In 1983, she married a Polish man named Jan Michalski (1953-2002), whom she met when they were both students at the University of Geneva.

in 2018 she opened a hotel in Warsaw, the Raffles Hotel Europejski.

Her wealth is derived from inheritance, and she owns 1.5% of Roche Holding.

Publishing
In 1986, Vera Michalski created Les Éditions Noir sur Blanc in Montricher with her husband, Jan Michalski. The idea was to publish writers –essentially of Slavic origins– and to offer fiction (novels, short stories, plays and poetry) as well as non-fiction (essays, documents, eye-witness accounts, personal journal and memoires) bearing witness to critical periods in the history of countries such as Poland and Russia.

Subsequently, the couple acquired several publishing houses that were later brought together under the holding group Libella, based in Lausanne. The holding now includes Noir sur Blanc, Les Éditions Phébus, Buchet-Chastel and Le Temps Apprivoisé, among others.

In Poland, Michalski owns Oficyna Literacka (Noir sur Blanc) in Warsaw and Wydawnictwo Literackie Krakow.

In 1991, Michalski bought The Polish Bookshop in Paris, called Librairie Polonaise, at 123 Boulevard Saint-Germain.

Although Michalski is heiress to the significant family fortune of Luc Hoffmann, she says she is careful to keep her publishing business separate from her philanthropic initiatives, notably the Maison de l'écriture (writing house) in Montricher, Switzerland. She does, however, admit that she can take certain risks which other, less financially secure publishers might not, and she can also publish niche-target works. Still, all her editorial projects are intended to be profitable.

Through her publishing business, Michalski aims to provide a bridge between Eastern and Western cultures. She and her husband began working in this area in 1986, before the fall of the Berlin Wall, when cultural exchanges were rather difficult. She speaks five languages fluently (French, German, English, Spanish and Polish) and some Russian.

Honours and awards 
In 2010, she received the Lilas de l'éditrice award. Vera Michalski was awarded prestigious awards during her career, including the Officer of the Order of Merit of the Republic of Poland (1995), the Knight of the Order of Arts and Letters of the French Republic, the Meritorious for Polish Culture (2011) and the Polish "Bene Merito" honorary distinction (2012).

Cultural philanthropy
In the autumn of 2007, Vera Michalski announced the creation of the Jan Michalski Foundation in Montricher, Switzerland. This foundation acquired a former summer camp and converted it into a centre welcoming writers. Several of them can stay simultaneously and for different lengths of time, never to exceed one year, however. Later, an exhibit space, an auditorium for concerts, symposiums, lectures or screenings and a library were added. The foundation awards certain writers with grants and from time to time underwrites certain publishing projects.

Vera Michalski also created the Jan Michalski International Prize for Literature, designed to recognize great work, regardless of the genre (novels, short stories, essays, books on art, etc.). The prize is worth 50,000 Swiss francs.

She supports the promotion of classical music and is a member of Honors of the Swiss classical music festival Les Sommets Musicaux de Gstaad.

Sources

External links 
Libella
Fondation Jan Michalski
Buchet Castel
Edition Phébus
Les cahiers dessinés
Le temps apprivoisé
Editions Libretto
Les éditions Noir sur Blanc
 BCU personnalité vaudoise
L'Expansion, 08/11/2001, Vera Michalski;
Le Nouvel Économiste - n°1359 - Du 28 septembre au 4 octobre, Vera Michalski, La mécène apprivoisée
La Fin de ma Russie, Catherine Sayn-Wittgenstein, translated from the German by Vera Michalski and published by Noir sur Blanc in 1990, is now published in pocket at Phoebus coll. Libretto.
Nos journaux cachés, Maria, Daria and Olga Razumovsky, edition Noir sur Blanc, 2004
Romandie.com : Roche: prolongation du pool d'actionnaires pour une durée illimitée, 4.02.2009

Swiss publishers (people)
Swiss book publishers (people)
French book publishers (people)
Polish publishers (people)
Businesspeople from Basel-Stadt
1954 births
Living people
20th-century Swiss businesswomen
20th-century Swiss businesspeople
21st-century Swiss businesswomen
21st-century Swiss businesspeople
Women book publishers (people)
Hoffmann-La Roche family
Graduate Institute of International and Development Studies alumni